Maharashtra College of Arts Science and Commerce, Mumbai, (informally Maharashtra College) is a college affiliated with the University of Mumbai offering undergraduate and postgraduate degrees in arts, science and commerce. It is located near Nagpada.

Maharashtra College  is managed by the Khairul Islam Higher Education Society, Mumbai. Society was founded by Rafiq Zakaria, Educationist.

Maharashtra College was the first educational institute in South Mumbai and one of the first in the state of Maharashta to power its electricity requirements completely from solar energy.

Maharashtra college offer a junior college and degree college courses. Maharashtra college also provides also some additional courses for degree college like Computer Science and Information technology.

Science 
 B.Sc. (C.S.) :- Computer science
 B.Sc. (I.T.) :- Information technology

References

Affiliates of the University of Mumbai
Education in Mumbai
Universities and colleges in Maharashtra
Educational institutions established in 1968
1968 establishments in India